Lucy Wambui Murigi (born 7 July 1985) is a female Kenyan mountain runner who won the 2017 World Mountain Running Championships. She also won the 2018 World Mountain Running Championships held in Andorra.

References

External links
 
 Lucy Wambui Murigi at ARRS

1985 births
Living people
Place of birth missing (living people)
Kenyan mountain runners
Kenyan female long-distance runners
World Mountain Running Championships winners
21st-century Kenyan women